Poppy Angela Delevingne (born 3 May 1986) is an English model, socialite and blogger.

Family and personal life
Delevingne was born on 3 May 1986, in London, one of three daughters of property developer Charles Hamar Delevingne and Pandora Anne Delevingne (née Stevens). She grew up in Belgravia and attended the independent Bedales School. She is the elder sister of model and actress Cara Delevingne.

Delevingne's maternal grandfather was publishing executive and English Heritage chairman Sir Jocelyn Stevens, the nephew of magazine publisher Sir Edward George Warris Hulton and the grandson of newspaper proprietor Sir Edward Hulton, 1st Baronet. Her maternal grandmother Janie Sheffield, a granddaughter of the 6th Baronet Sheffield, was lady-in-waiting to Princess Margaret.

Her paternal grandmother was the socialite The Hon. Angela Margo Hamar Greenwood and her paternal great-grandparents were the Canadian-born British politician Hamar Greenwood, 1st Viscount Greenwood and Margery Greenwood, Viscountess Greenwood. Through one of her maternal great-great-grandfathers, Sir Lionel Lawson Faudel-Phillips, 3rd Baronet, Delevingne descends from the Anglo-Jewish Faudel-Phillips baronets; two of her ancestors on that line served as Lord Mayor of London.

Delevingne is a muse and friend of fashion designer Matthew Williamson, and previously shared a New York apartment with actress Sienna Miller.

In October 2012, Delevingne became engaged to James Cook, a former model, who works for his family's aerospace company. They were married in May 2014.

Career
In 2004, Delevingne was featured on the music video "Sunday Morning" by Maroon 5, as the karaoke singer in Japan.

Delevingne was spotted by Storm Management founder Sarah Doukas in 2008.

She has modelled for brands such as Shiatzy Chen, Laura Ashley, Anya Hindmarch, Alberta Ferretti, and Burberry, has walked the runway for brands including Julien Macdonald and Giles Deacon, and has worked with photographers such as Terry Richardson. Having caught the eye of designer Marc Jacobs, she became the face of the Louis Vuitton summer 2012 collection. Delevingne has graced the covers of Vogue (Turkey), Harper's Bazaar (Korea), Elle (Mexico, Ukraine, Korea, Norway) and Love.

Delevingne is a Young Ambassador for the British Fashion Council, a Chanel brand ambassador, and serves as a spokesperson representing Jo Malone London.

In 2017, Delevingne played the role of Clara Von Gluckfberg in Kingsman: The Golden Circle, and the role of Adrianna Colonna in The Aspern Papers directed by Julien Landais.

In 2020 Delevingne teamed up with her sisters (the older Chloe and the younger Cara) to launch Della Vite, an award-winning, sustainably-produced, vegan range of Prosecco wines. This Italian beverage had long been a family favourite; the brand was named after the phrase "of the vine" (Della Vite in Italian and Delevingne in French).

Filmography

Film

Television

Music videos

Ancestry

References

External links

 
 Poppy Delevingne at Models.com
 

1986 births
English female models
English people of Canadian descent
English people of Jewish descent
English socialites
Poppy
Hulton family
Living people
People educated at Bedales School
Models from London
IMG Models models
Fashion influencers
British women bloggers
English bloggers
21st-century English women